Aktogay is a village in Aktogay District, Karaganda Region, Kazakhstan. It is the administrative center of the Aktogay District, as well as the only settlement of the Aktogay Rural District (KATO code - 353630100). Population:

Geography

References

Populated places in Karaganda Region